Blaine Willenborg (born January 4, 1960) is a former professional tennis player from the United States.

Willenborg enjoyed most of his tennis success while playing doubles. During his career he won 7 doubles titles and finished runner-up an additional 9 times. He achieved a career-high doubles ranking of World No. 13 in 1988.  His career high singles ranking was world No. 50, which he reached on September 9, 1984.

Career finals

Doubles (7 titles, 9 runner-ups)

External links
 
 

American male tennis players
Tennis players from Miami
UCLA Bruins men's tennis players
Universiade medalists in tennis
American people of Swedish descent
Living people
1960 births
Universiade silver medalists for the United States
Medalists at the 1979 Summer Universiade